Lu Kuang may refer to:

 Lukuang football team, now National Sports Training Center football team, Taiwan
 Lü Kuang, a military officer in the Battle of Nanpi